Edwin Anderson Alderman (May 15, 1861 – April 30, 1931) served as the President of three universities. The University of Virginia's Alderman Library is named after him, as is Edwin A. Alderman Elementary School in Wilmington and Alderman dorm at the University of North Carolina at Chapel Hill.  Alderman was the key leader in higher education in Virginia during the Progressive Era as president of the University of Virginia, 1904–31. His goal was the transformation of the Southern university into a force for state service and intellectual leadership and educational utility. Alderman successfully professionalized and modernized Virginia's system of higher education. He promoted international standards of scholarship and a statewide network of extension services. Joined by other college presidents, he promoted the Virginia Education Commission, created in 1910. Alderman's crusade encountered some resistance from traditionalists and never challenged the Jim Crow system of segregated schooling.

Early years
Alderman was born in Wilmington, North Carolina, on May 15, 1861. He was son of James and Susan (Corbett) Alderman, grandson of Patrick and Susan (Wallace) Alderman and descended from Scotch and English ancestors, who emigrated in 1774 and settled on Lower Cape Fear at North Carolina.

Alderman was prepared for college at the schools in Wilmington and at Bethel Military Academy, Virginia, from 1876 to 1878. In 1882 he graduated with a Bachelor of Philosophy from the University of North Carolina, where he was a member of the Dialectic Society.

Career
He became a schoolteacher in Goldsboro, North Carolina, superintendent of city schools there, from 1885 to 1889, and conductor of the state teachers' institutes, from 1889 to 1892. In 1891, Alderman and Charles Duncan McIver successfully pressed the North Carolina Legislature to establish the Normal and Industrial School for Women, now known as the University of North Carolina at Greensboro.

He was elected a member of the American Historical Association in 1892, member of the Maryland Historical Society in 1893, and member of the National Education Association in 1894. In 1892 Alderman became professor of history at State Normal College and taught there until 1893 when he became professor of pedagogy at the University of North Carolina, and he was named president of that institution in 1896, then he moved on to take the same position at Tulane University in 1900, before moving again to the University of Virginia in 1904. There he stayed for 27 years, until his death in 1931 from a stroke in Connellsville, Pennsylvania, while en route to deliver a speech in Illinois. He is buried at the University of Virginia Cemetery.

Alderman received the D.C.L. from the University of the South in 1896, also received the degree of LL.D. from Tulane University in 1898, and from Johns Hopkins University in 1902. He was a noted public speaker, and won fame for his memorial address for Woodrow Wilson, delivered to a joint session of Congress on December 15, 1924.

At the University of Virginia
In 1904, the Board of Visitors of the University of Virginia invited Alderman, then president of Tulane University, to become the first president of the University of Virginia. Since its founding in 1819, university had been governed by its Board of Visitors, but increasing discord between Visitors and the faculty, as well as the rising administrative burden of dealing with expanding academic departments and burgeoning student enrollments, led to the decision to move forward with the creation of the office of the president.

Alderman was not the first choice for the new office. After considering other candidates, including Virginia Law former student Woodrow Wilson, the Board had first invited its former member George W. Miles, a colonel who had served on the staff of Virginia Governor James Hoge Tyler. The faculty opposed Miles' nomination and he was forced to withdraw. Other candidates were proposed, including Francis Preston Venable (who had succeeded Alderman as president of the University of North Carolina), but Alderman was unanimously chosen as the consensus candidate on June 14, 1904. He began to serve in the fall of 1904 but was not formally inaugurated until April 13, 1905 (Thomas Jefferson's birthday, celebrated as Founder's Day).

The University of Virginia changed in several significant ways under Alderman's guidance. First, he focused new attention on matters of public concern, helped create departments of geology and forestry, added significantly to the University Hospital to support new sickbeds and public health research, helped create the Curry School of Education, established the extension and summer school programs, and helped create the first school of finance and commerce at the school. He then restructured existing programs, separating the former “academic department” into the College of Arts and Sciences and Graduate School of Arts and Sciences, in accordance with a growing move to standardize college educations by the Association of American Universities. The enrollment of the school greatly increased under his administration, as well, going from 500 regular session students in 1904 to 2,200 in 1929.

Alderman also laid the financial groundwork for the university's future. During the first years of his presidency he established its first endowment fund and led the fundraising of almost $700,000 to meet a $500,000 challenge grant from Andrew Carnegie. By the end of his presidency the endowment would increase to $10 million.

He spent two-thirds of his long-term at the University of Virginia physically disabled after a bad bout with tuberculosis.

Academic career
1896-1900 – President of the University of North Carolina (Chapel Hill, North Carolina)
1900-1904 – President of Tulane University (New Orleans, Louisiana)
1904-1931 – President of the University of Virginia (Charlottesville, Virginia)

Works

Alderman is the author of
 An address, delivered Oct. 15th, 1892 (1893)
 Life of William Hooper, Signer of the Declaration of Independence (1894)
 Short History of North Carolina (1896)
 Library of Southern literature (1909) as editor

References

Citations

Sources

External links

 
 
 

Tulane University faculty
Leaders of the University of North Carolina at Chapel Hill
University of Virginia faculty
Presidents of the University of Virginia
1861 births
1931 deaths
University of North Carolina at Chapel Hill alumni
Presidents of Tulane University
Burials at the University of Virginia Cemetery
Members of the American Philosophical Society